Acanthobothrium zimmeri is a species of tapeworm named after the author Carl Zimmer. A. zimmeri was first described in 2009 based on specimens collected from the Arafura Sea in Australia's Northern Territory. It parasitizes a species of stingray in the genus Himantura.  It has also been found to parasite Urogymnus acanthobothrium.

References

Further reading
 "ITIS - Report: Acanthobothrium zimmeri". Itis.gov.
 The World’s Strangest Scientific Names

Eucestoda
Species described in 2009